Lara and the Beat is a 2018 Nigerian drama film, directed by Tosin Coker, starring Seyi Shay, Vector, Somkele Iyamah, Wale Ojo, Sharon Ooja, Shaffy Bello and Uche Jombo. The film premiered on 8 July 2018.

Lara and the Beat is a coming of age story about the beautiful Giwa Sisters who are caught in the center of a financial scandal with their late parents media empire. The sisters are forced out of their privileged bubble and must learn to build their own future and salvage their family's legacy through music and enterprise.

Cast 
 Seyi Shay as Lara Giwa
 Somkele Iyamah as Dara Giwa
 Vector as Sal Gomez (Mr Beats)
 Chioma Chukwuka as Aunty Patience
 Uche Jombo as Fadekemi West
 Sharon Ooja as Ngozi
 Shafy Bello as Jide's Mum
 Saheed Balogun as Board Chairman
 Kemi Lala Akindoju as Tonye
 Ademola Adedoyin as Wale Ladejobi
 Chinedu Ikedieze as Big Chi
 Folu Storms as Tina
 Bimbo Manuel as Uncle Richard
 Wale Ojo as Uncle Tunde
 Deyemi Okanlawon as Cashflow
 DJ Xclusive as Jide

References

External links
 

2018 films
Nigerian musical drama films
2018 drama films
2010s musical drama films
2010s coming-of-age drama films
Films shot in Lagos
Yoruba-language films
English-language Nigerian films
Nigerian coming-of-age films
2010s English-language films